Podanin  is a village in the administrative district of Gmina Chodzież, within Chodzież County, Greater Poland Voivodeship, in west-central Poland.

The village has a population of 492.

References

See also
Standesamt Podanin

Podanin